Amigo Comics is a Spanish company which publishes creator-owned comic books. However, despite being a Spanish company, its titles are solely published in the United States through Behemoth Comics. Titles are also licensed out to other foreign publishers via foreign licensing agreements. In 2019, the company received its first Eisner nomination through the Best Archival Collection/Project—Strips category for their title Sky Masters of the Space Force: The Complete Sunday Strips in Color. In March 2020, the company agreed to an imprint deal with Behemoth that would see all future releases published through Behemoth in the US.

Titles
Comic books published by Amigo in the format of ongoing or limited series are:
Alan Dracon, #1–4 (2016–2017)
Apocalypse Girl
v1, #1–4 (2017–2018)
v2, #1–4 (2019–2020)
Arkane Secrets, #1–3 (2013–2014)
Barbara the Barbarian, #1–3 (2020)
Beast No More - Metamorphosis (2017)
The Blackening, #1–6 (2018–2019)
The Cabinet of Doctor Caligari, #1–2 (2017)
Crossover! (2019)
Drums, TPB (2016), collects the 2011 Image Comics series.
Ezequiel Himes: Zombie Hunter, #1–2 (2020)
Gargantuan, #0–4 (2019)
Ghost Wolf
v1, #1–4 (2014)
v2, #1–4 (2017–2018)
v3, #1–4 (2020)
The Last Hunt, #1–4 (2017)
Lunita, #1–4 (2013–2014)
Metallic Silence, #1–2 (2015)
Nancy in Hell
v1, #1–4 (2018–2020)
A Dragon in Hell (2014)
The Hell Gates (2020)
Nasty Pills, #1–2 (2019)
Phantasmagoria: The Ghost Lens, #1–3 (2018–2019)
Planet of Demons: The Eye of Lucifer, #1–4 (2016–2017)
Rise of the Tyrant (2020)
Rogues!
v1, #1–6 (2013–2014)
v2 - The Cold Ship, #1–5 (2014)
v3 - The Burning Heart, #1–5 (2015–2016)
v4 - Odd Parenthood, #1–5 (2016)
v5 - Tales of Rogues, #1–6 (2018)
v6 - The Shadow Over Gerada, #1–2 (2018)
Roman Ritual, #1–4 (2014–2015)
Sindey Hammer
Sidney Hammer (2014)
Sidney Hammer versus the Wicker Wolf (2016)
Hidden Blood (2018)
Straightjacket, #1–4 (2015–2016)
Street Tiger, #1–4 (2017)
Tales from the Suicide Forest (2016)
Titan, #1–4 (2018)
Unleash, #1–4 (2016–2017)
The Westwood Witches, #1–4 (2013–2014)

References

External links
Official website

Comic book publishing companies of Spain
Publishing companies established in 2012